Matekitonga Moeakiola (born 16 May 1978) is a former Tonga-born American rugby union player who last played for Castanet Rugby at club level. Moeakiola played as a prop.

Moeakiola played for both East Coast Bays RFC and Glenfield RFC in the Harbour club rugby competition. Moeakiola also played for Patumahoe RFC in the Counties Manukau Club rugby competition. Mate never played for Harbour or Counties NPC sides.

Mate was first noticed by the U.S. national team while playing rugby at the University of Utah. He has since played for the North America 4 Tournament, and the U.S. team that played Munster in Chicago.

Mate played at the 2007 Rugby World Cup. Moeakiola made his debut at the 2007 Rugby World Cup, scoring a try after coming on as a substitute in the Eagles' opening match against . Moeakiola played in all four matches at the 2007 RWC and scored a try against England in the USA’s first match of the tournament.

References

External links
 Info at usarugby.com
 Stats at scrum.com

American rugby union players
Tongan emigrants to the United States
1978 births
Living people
Rugby union props
People from Tongatapu
United States international rugby union players
American expatriate rugby union players
Expatriate rugby union players in France
American expatriate sportspeople in France
University of Utah alumni